The history of Deportivo Saprissa begins with the club's foundation in 1935.

Foundation and the amateur era (1935–1948)
Deportivo Saprissa was founded on July 16, 1935 by Roberto Fernández in his shoe store in el barrio Los Ángeles in downtown San José, Costa Rica. After a meeting with the football club's members Beto Fernandez decided to name his team after the man who sponsored their uniform, Don Ricardo Saprissa Aymá and with this announcement they entered the Costa Rican Third Division as Saprissa F.C.

In 1947 with Ricardo Saprissa's financial support and excellent coaching by Francisco García, Llos morados won the Costa Rican Third Division Championship. In 1948 they were promoted to the Costa Rican Second Division and then won the championship, winning promotion to the Primera División de Costa Rica, making their debut in the top flight on 21 August 1949. The club has remained in the Costa Rican top flight ever since.

Professional era (1948–1990s)
In March 1959, Deportivo Saprissa achieved recognition as being the first Latin American soccer team to travel around the world. They played 22 games in 6 countries and 3 colonial enclaves, in which they won 14 games, tied one, and lost 7. In Costa Rica, they were named the "Team of the Century" as they had participated in 50 Costa Rican Championships. They also have the immense prestige of winning six consecutive Costa Rican National Championships between 1972 and 1977, a record that stands in Costa Rica, and is shared with Olimpia of Paraguay within the Americas.

During the end of the 1980s and beginning of the 1990s, Saprissa was the backbone of the Costa Rica national football team, whose international pinnacle came at the 1990 FIFA World Cup held in Italy, when against all odds, Costa Rica reached the second round, eliminating countries such as Scotland and Sweden.

1959 tour
In March 1959, Deportivo Saprissa achieved recognition for being the first Latin American football team to travel around the world. On their travels they visited 25 different countries, playing 22 games in nine countries. They won 14 games, drew one, and lost seven.

References

External links
 Article on Deportivo Saprissa website 
 List of matches from RSSSF

Deportivo Saprissa